Lloyd Pope (born 1 December 1999) is an Australian cricketer who currently represents South Australia. In August 2017, he was offered a rookie contract with South Australia.

In December 2017, he was named in Australia's squad for the 2018 Under-19 Cricket World Cup. On 23 January 2018, in the Under-19 Cricket World Cup, Pope took figures of 8/35 in Australia's quarter-final match against England. These were the best bowling figures in the history of the Under-19 Cricket World Cup. He was the leading wicket-taker for Australia in the tournament, with eleven dismissals.

He made his first-class debut for South Australia in the 2018–19 Sheffield Shield season on 16 October 2018. Later the same month, in his second first-class match, he took seven wickets for 87 runs in the first innings against Queensland. In doing so, he became the youngest bowler to take a seven-wicket haul in the Sheffield Shield.

He made his Twenty20 debut for Sydney Sixers in the 2018–19 Big Bash League season on 22 December 2018. He made his List A debut for South Australia, on 26 September 2019, in the 2019–20 Marsh One-Day Cup.

Pope was part of the Sydney Sixers title-winning squad in the 2019-20 Big Bash League season, playing eight matches over the season and taking 10 wickets.

On 10 October 2020, in the 2020–21 Sheffield Shield, Pope became the first leg spinner in 50 years to take a five-wicket haul on the opening day of a Sheffield Shield season.

Pope is also well renowned for his hair, becoming a cult hero of Australian cricket due to his “flowing red hair”.

References

External links
 
 SACA Player Profile
 Sydney Sixers Player Profile

1999 births
Living people
Australian cricketers
South Australia cricketers
Sydney Sixers cricketers
Place of birth missing (living people)